David Beall is a retired American soccer midfielder who played professionally in the Continental Indoor Soccer League and USISL.

Beall attended the University of San Diego, playing on the men's soccer team from 1990 to 1993.  In 1994, Beall signed with the San Diego Sockers of the Continental Indoor Soccer League. On February 7, 1996, the Los Angeles Galaxy selected Beall in the fourteenth round (134th overall) of the 1996 MLS Inaugural Player Draft. The Galaxy released him late in the pre-season. Beall then moved to the Carolina Dynamo of the USISL. In 1997, he played for the Orange County Zodiac.

References

1972 births
Living people
American soccer players
North Carolina Fusion U23 players
Continental Indoor Soccer League players
Orange County Blue Star players
San Diego Sockers (CISL) players
San Diego Toreros men's soccer players
USISL players
Association football midfielders